Bowling Green is an unincorporated community in Washington Township, Clay County, Indiana. It is part of the Terre Haute Metropolitan Statistical Area.

History
The town was probably named after Bowling Green, Virginia. The first post office was established at Bowling Green in 1825. With the establishment of Clay County in the same year, Bowling Green became the site of the county's first courthouse, which was completed in 1828. Bowling Green was incorporated as a town in 1869, but subsequently lost its status as county seat to the town of Brazil in 1876.

Geography

Climate
The climate of Bowling Green is characterized by relatively high temperatures and evenly distributed precipitation throughout the year.  The Köppen Climate Classification subtype for this climate is "Cfa". (Humid Subtropical Climate).

Demographics

Bowling Green appeared on U.S. Census returns between 1850 and 1960. Its population peaked in 1870, when it had a reported 606 inhabitants.

Notable people
George N. Beamer, judge of the United States District Court for the Northern District of Indiana and 30th Indiana Attorney General.

References

Unincorporated communities in Clay County, Indiana
Unincorporated communities in Indiana
Terre Haute metropolitan area
Populated places established in 1825
1825 establishments in Indiana